Dmytro Pashytskyy (born 29 November 1987) is a Ukrainian professional volleyball player with Russian citizenship. At the professional club level, he plays for ZAKSA Kędzierzyn-Koźle.

Personal life
Dmitry Pashitsky was born in Kyiv, but spent a significant part of his life in Riga (Latvia), where he began playing volleyball.

Career

Clubs
Pashytskyy started his professional volleyball career in Pärnu VK in 2009. For the next season he joined another Estonian team, Selver Tallinn, with which he won the Estonian Championship, Estonian Cup and the Baltic League in 2011.

In 2011, Pashytskyy moved to France to join one of the most decorated volleyball clubs in French volleyball history, AS Cannes. In 2013, he received an award for the Best Middle Blocker of the 2012–13 season.

The 2014–15 season, Pashytskyy spent playing in the Polish PlusLiga team, Cuprum Lubin. Не became the best blocker of the 2014–15 PlusLiga season by setting a new league record of 116 blocks that still remains unbroken. Also, he became the best scorer of the team, which is extremely unusual for the middle blocker position.

In 2015, Pashytskyy joined Asseco Resovia, the 2015 Polish Champion, with which he won the 2015–16 PlusLiga silver medal and participated in the Final 4 of the 2015–16 CEV Champions League. For the 2016–17 season he was loaned to Lotos Trefl Gdańsk. During the time spent playing in the Polish PlusLiga he received individual MVP award nine times.

In 2017, Pashytskyy signed a contract with Kuzbass Kemerovo, with which he won the Russian Champion title in 2019 and the SuperCup the same season. He also made it to the semifinals of 2018–19 CEV Cup. During the 2019–20 season he won a bronze medal in the Russian Super League and reached the semifinals of the 2019–20 CEV Champions League.

On 15 June 2020, Pashytskyy joined Zenit Saint Petersburg, with which he became a silver medalist of the Russian Super League in the season of 2020–21. In the same season, he also made it to the finals of both, the Russian Cup and the 2020–21 CEV Cup.

In the spring of 2022, Pashytskyy returned to Lotos Trefl Gdańsk and helped the team reach the play-off stage of the Polish PlusLiga.

For the 2022–23 PlusLiga season, Pashytskyy signed a contract with ZAKSA Kędzierzyn-Koźle, with which he won the Polish Cup in 2023.

Honours

Clubs
 CEV Cup
  2020/2021 – with Zenit Saint Petersburg

 Baltic League
  2010/2011 – with Selver Tallinn

 National championships
 2010/2011  Estonian Cup, with Selver Tallinn
 2010/2011  Estonian Championship, with Selver Tallinn
 2025/2016  Polish Vice-Champion, with Asseco Resovia
 2017/2018  Runner-Up of Russian Cup, with Kuzbass Kemerovo
 2018/2019  Russian Championship, with Kuzbass Kemerovo
 2019/2020  Russian SuperCup, with Kuzbass Kemerovo
 2019/2020  Bronze medalist of Russian SuperLigue, with Kuzbass Kemerovo
 2020/2021  Russian Vice-Champion, with Zenit Saint Petersburg
 2020/2021  Runner-Up of Russian Cup, with Zenit Saint Petersburg
 2022/2023  Polish Cup, with ZAKSA Kędzierzyn-Koźle

Individual awards
 2013: French Championship – Best Middle Blocker 
 2015: Polish Championship – Best Blocker (116)

References

External links

 
 Player profile at PlusLiga.pl 
 Player profile at Volleybox.net

1987 births
Living people
Naturalised citizens of Russia
Sportspeople from Kyiv
Ukrainian men's volleyball players
Russian men's volleyball players
Ukrainian expatriate sportspeople in Estonia
Expatriate volleyball players in Estonia
Ukrainian expatriate sportspeople in France
Expatriate volleyball players in France
Ukrainian expatriate sportspeople in Poland
Expatriate volleyball players in Poland
AS Cannes Volley-Ball players
Cuprum Lubin players
Resovia (volleyball) players
Trefl Gdańsk players
VC Zenit Saint Petersburg players
ZAKSA Kędzierzyn-Koźle players
Middle blockers